Solar Foods is a Finnish food-tech startup that is pilot testing a technology that uses electricity to produce hydrogen which is combined with carbon dioxide, water, vitamins and minerals to feed and grow a microbial biomass that can be used as edible protein. The company was founded in 2017.

Solar Foods is developing processes to manufacture a protein powder called Solein that has potential as a protein ingredient in food production, and plans to license its technology. The product has a mild flavour and can be added to other foods.

History

Solar Foods is a spin-off company. Its original idea is based on a joint research project focusing on renewable energy, carried out by VTT Technical Research Centre of Finland and Lappeenranta-Lahti University of Technology LUT. In summer 2017, when the research group announced having succeeded in producing biomass from the fixation of the carbon in atmospheric carbon dioxide, it received publicity internationally. The company was founded the same year by Pasi Vainikka and Juha-Pekka Pitkänen together with Sami Holmström, Jero Ahola, Jari Tuovinen and Janne Mäkelä. The company aimed at starting the first phase of commercial protein production during 2021 at a factory with an estimated annual capacity of 100 tonnes of protein.

By spring 2018, Solar Foods had raised €800,000 in seed funding to build a pilot plant. The principal investor was Lifeline Ventures and other investors included VTT Ventures and Green Campus Innovations, a cleantech seed investor operating on the LUT campus. Additionally, the company received a product development loan of over €1 million from Business Finland. Solar Foods began to build a bioreactor tank with a production capacity of 1 kg of microbes per day. The company's previous bioreactor had been about the size of a coffee cup. That autumn, Solar Foods was selected for the Business Incubation Programme of the European Space Agency (ESA). The company's goal was to develop a system for producing food on Mars. A 40-litre bioreactor would be able to produce enough protein for a six-member crew. The company had three employees.

In March 2019, Solar Foods received a €50,000 grant from the Bank of Åland's Baltic Sea Project. That spring, Solar Foods started its pilot plant, which produces protein that is used to develop new products together with partners. In summer, the company announced its plan to build a bigger protein factory with a capacity of approximately 6,000 tonnes a year. The final decision to build will be made once the company has gained sufficient operating experience from the smaller plant. In September 2019, Fazer Group and Solar Foods announced a partnership to develop the Solein protein. The partnership was part of a financing round that brought Solar Foods €3.5 million as convertibles from Oy Karl Fazer Ab, Holdix Oy Ab, Turret Oy Ab and Lifeline Ventures.

By April 2020, the company had raised a total of €4.3 million in funding. That summer, the pilot plant was producing 300 grams of protein a day, and Solar Foods announced plans to open, within the next couple of years, a new plant that would be a hundredfold bigger than its current plant. That could again be scaled up to factory size, that is, to a plant the size of a football field. The company proposes building Solein factories in areas that are not suitable for food production with current methods, but that have solar or wind energy potential, such as the Sahara desert and Arctic. The company is developing consumer products that could be used as breakfast ingredients or as substitutes for dairy products or meat.

In April 2021, Finnish Climate Fund gave Solar Foods a €10 million capital loan. In May 2022, the company announced an agreement with Danske Bank, Finnvera and EKF, raising €15 million in financing for Solar Foods’ first production facility, being constructed in Vantaa and expected to enter production in 2023.

Singapore will be the first to grant approval for the novel food Solein.

Product idea
The production method is based on research carried out by VTT Technical Research Centre of Finland and LUT University. The idea behind it originates from the 1960s. 

The product is made by extracting carbon dioxide from the atmosphere and combining it with water, hydrogen, nutrients and vitamins. The protein is produced using electricity inside a bioreactor. The electricity serves to hydrolyze water to yield hydrogen gas. The company uses solar energy from its partner Fortum. The microbes utilised in the protein production process are hydrogen-oxidizing bacteria. Solar Foods have filed patents around a specific strain of bacteria, Xanthobacter VTT-E-193585.

The environmentalist George Monbiot has claimed the product could have a revolutionary impact on food production. Solar Foods envisions carbon-neutral food production in which agriculture would no longer be needed to produce food and the land freed from agriculture could be reforested and converted into carbon sinks. They believe this would also reduce agricultural nutrient pollution and subsequent water supply problems. The company has said the land efficiency for Solar Foods methods would be about 20,000 times greater than for conventional farming. In 2020, Michael Le Page, writing in the New Scientist, took a more sceptical view, noting that the 20,000-fold improvement only applies to the factories themselves. If land use for solar panels is taken into account, then land efficiency only improves by about 10-fold. Despite his doubts over how beneficial the technology would be overall, Le Page stated that "the potential rewards are so immense that we should be pouring vast sums of money into finding out."

Solein product

Solar Foods manufactures Solein single-cell protein. Solar Foods applied in 2022 for approval from the European Food Safety Authority EFSA to offer Solein for human consumption. Solein is vegan (and may be preferable to vegans over other foods because of rodent or insect deaths from agriculture), and the finished product contains approximately 65 percent protein, 20–25 percent carbohydrates and 5–10 percent fats. Solein also contains small amounts of essential minerals, such as phosphorus and potassium. The carbon dioxide emissions from single-cell cultivation are a hundred times lower than from meat production and ten times lower than from crop production.

The protein produced by Solar Foods is similar to that used in Quorn products. The characteristics of Solein are similar to those of soy and dried algae. It is said to be mild in flavor and, when added to a pancake base, to taste a bit like egg. It could be used in various kinds of food products, such as plant-based yoghurts, smoothies, bread or pasta, or as an ingredient in plant-based meat substitutes.  It could also be used in animal feed.

Competitors

Other companies aiming to produce protein using hydrogenotrophs include Air Protein based in the USA and Deep Branch in the UK.

Awards and recognition
In 2019, Solar Foods received the Index Award, financed by the state of Denmark and worth €100,000.

See also
List of meat substitutes

References

External links

 Solar Foods Ltd. website

Food and drink companies of Finland
Meat substitutes
Vegetarian companies and establishments
Single-cell protein